Dr. Ramanand Yadav is an Indian politician. He was elected to the Bihar Legislative Assembly from Fatuha (Vidhan Sabha constituency) as the 2015 Member of Bihar Legislative Assembly as a member of the Rashtriya Janata Dal.

References

Rashtriya Janata Dal politicians
Bihar MLAs 2015–2020
Bihar MLAs 2020–2025
People from Patna
1955 births
Living people
Bihar MLAs 2010–2015
Bihar MLAs 2000–2005